Angry Birds Fight! is a match-3 puzzle video game with role-playing game elements and is the eleventh installment in the Angry Birds series. The game was co-developed by Rovio Entertainment and Kiteretsu Inc. The game was soft-launched in some Asian Pacific countries in early 2015 and the worldwide release was on June 11, 2015. In the game the player must match enough Angry Birds to earn enough power to defeat the enemy players and pigs. It was called a combination of Candy Crush and RPG gaming.

On August 1, 2017, the game was removed from the Play Store and App Store with the game's servers permanently shutting down by that November.

Gameplay

Players are pitted in matches that are either real-time player-vs-player battles or against a computer-controlled opponent using their selected avatars which are bird team (that are unlocked through gameplay) or pig team (that are unlocked through slots).

The gameplay is divided into two stages: Matching and Combat.

The matching stage starts with 7 by 7 boards layout which appear the same for both players.  To progress, players must move the panel to match 3 of the same colored panels for 45 seconds. Every matching panel will erase them from the board and give the birds some boost of either health, attack or defense depending the birds matched during the matching stages.

If the players are able to match 4 of the same color panels that are same as their chosen birds, it will trigger a Sabotage which will disrupt the opponent's gameplay. The Sabotage effect depends on the chosen bird of the players who triggers the Sabotage.

If the players manage to match 5 matching color panels, Fever Time is activated where the player's attack and defense will be doubled for every matching panels.

After matching, the combat stage starts. The two birds will fight in the arena with the stats gained during matching stage until the attack power runs out. Then the winner will be the one with the most health. If both of the birds are still left with the defenses, the combat will be considered as a draw. After a match is over, players earn experience to slowly level up and may randomly obtain new equipment.  The equipment equipped may gives some edges in the battle as different items gives different effects to the players during the Combat stage.

There are two currencies, earned in-game gold and gems. Gold is used to slightly enhance existing equipment  and gems may be used to give more gameplay turns or play the slot machine which awards powerful equipment.

There is also a bonus stage known as, Dr. Pig's lab . The Dr. Pig's lab is time constrained dungeon where on each level, players are given 1 hour to clear the particular level. If the birds are exhausted during clearing the dungeon, the bird cannot be used anymore until the next raiding sessions. Upon success of clearing the dungeon, there are chances  that helps players to obtain powerful items. But the item's abilities are in effects only for Dr Pigs Lab stage only.

The birds and pigs look similar as they appeared in Angry Birds Epic and Stella's look is from Angry Birds Stella.

Events

Monster Pig Events 
A Monster Pig (usually based on a marine animal) will be released from the nefarious Dr. Pig's laboratory, terrorizing the seas. The player is then (optionally) able to fight the Monster Pigs via their own customized ship, dueling the beasts for points (easier Monster Pigs wield lower points and harder Monster Pigs reward more points) in exchange for limited-time items, and at the same time competing against people from across the globe.

Arena Events
Arena events are also a major occurrence that appear in-game and they never run simultaneously with Monster Pig Events. The premise of Arena are all of player battles with the same bird, with each bird "clone" dueling it out for exclusive historical-based items, such as the Excalibur. Each fight in the Arena requires 1 Arena ticket per entry and it can be gained through the login bonus every 6 hours or through normal battles. Each battle wins will be awarded with Event Points. The Event Points collected will determine the ranking in the leaderboard. The players will be awarded with the prizes based on the rankings in the leaderboard at the end of the events.

Reception 

The game received mixed reviews. It holds a rating of 54/100 on Metacritic. It also holds 2 out of 5 stars on TouchArcade.

References

External links

 

Fight!
2015 video games
Android (operating system) games
Delisted digital-only games
Inactive online games
IOS games
Puzzle video games
Video games developed in Finland
Role-playing video games
Rovio Entertainment games
Products and services discontinued in 2017